The Marussia F1 Team (subsequently Manor Marussia F1 Team) was a Formula One racing team and constructor which was based in Banbury, Oxfordshire and then later Dinnington, South Yorkshire in the United Kingdom and competed with a Russian licence from  to  and a British licence in . The team was operated by Manor Motorsport (formerly Marussia Manor Racing), which was previously a subsidiary of Marussia Motors, a now defunct sports car manufacturer which was based in Moscow.

The Marussia team scored its first championship points at the 2014 Monaco Grand Prix, where its leading driver, Jules Bianchi, finished ninth, and in doing so Marussia became the first Russian-licensed constructor to score world championship points.

Following a serious crash and injuries sustained by Bianchi at the 2014 Japanese Grand Prix, the team raced for the first time with a single car at the inaugural 2014 Russian Grand Prix. On 26 October 2014, news reports emerged that the Marussia team would not participate at the 2014 United States Grand Prix due to financial reasons and that, on 7 October 2014, the team filed a notice in the London High Court intending to go into administration. The appointed administrator released an official statement on 27 October 2014 and the team was still included in FIA's provisional entry list for the 2015 Formula One season but as the "Manor F1 Team". On 7 November 2014, however, the administrator announced that the team had ceased trading.

On 19 January 2015, the administrators of Marussia announced that the auction of its cars and assets had been cancelled so as to allow a possible buy-out to take place. The team collapsed owing around £60m, two of the companies out of pocket being Marussia's former competitors McLaren and Ferrari. The team exited administration on 19 February 2015, and was re-established as the Manor Marussia F1 Team after a CVA had been signed and new investment was secured to rescue the team. Former Sainsbury's CEO Justin King was reportedly the team's main backer. The team retained Marussia as its constructor name throughout the 2015 season, also adopting British nationality. In 2016, the  team announced a name change to "Manor Racing". Manor lasted the 2016 season and used Mercedes-Benz power units.

History

Background

In 2009, Manor Grand Prix were awarded an entry into Formula One for the  season, as a tie-up between successful junior racing team Manor Motorsport and Wirth Research. Before the end of that year, these entities became known as Virgin Racing, after Richard Branson's Virgin Group of companies who had bought the title sponsorship rights. Marussia were one of the team's partners for its debut season, where it finished in twelfth and last place in the Constructors' Championship. In November 2010, Marussia Motors purchased a controlling stake in the team, and the team became known as 'Marussia Virgin Racing' for the  season. Following a disappointing start to the 2011 season, the team parted company with Wirth Research and entered a partnership with McLaren Applied Technologies ahead of the 2012 season. With this came a relocation from the original base in Dinnington, to the old Wirth premises in Banbury in Great Britain. Meanwhile, the team again finished the year bottom of the Constructors' Championship. In November 2011, it applied to the Formula One commission to formally change their constructor name for the 2012 season from Virgin to Marussia, to reflect their new ownership. Permission was granted before being formally ratified at a meeting of the FIA World Motor Sport Council.

2012 season

On 31 December 2011, Marussia Virgin Racing announced they were now called Marussia F1 Team. Virgin, who had previously been the title sponsor for the team, announced that they would be staying with the team and feature its logos staying on the 2012 car. The team had announced in July 2011 that Timo Glock had signed a new three-year contract with the team. Glock would be joined for the 2012 season by GP2 Series graduate Charles Pic, who spent two days testing with the team at the Young Driver Test in Abu Dhabi.

By 29 September 2011, Marussia already had a 60% scale model of their 2012 car ready for use in the McLaren wind tunnel. The team received its first parts for the car in December 2011. The team also announced that the 2012 car would be the only car on the grid not to have the new-to-F1, Kinetic Energy Recovery System (KERS). This status lasted only for one race weekend. Rival team HRT failed to qualify within the 107% time and were not allowed to race at the season opener in Australia. HRT decided that it was best to remove KERS from the car and focus on successfully qualifying.

Prior to the final testing session for the 2012 season at Barcelona, on 27 February the team announced via its website that the new MR01 car had failed the last of the mandatory 18 crash tests required of each car by the FIA.

On 5 March 2012, Marussia revealed the MR01 at Silverstone. The car design was led by technical consultant Pat Symonds and the team became the penultimate team to reveal its car for the 2012 season.

On 3 July 2012, test driver María de Villota was testing a car at Duxford Airfield, when she crashed heavily into the lift gate of the team transporter, and sustained serious injuries. On 4 July 2012, it was confirmed that de Villota lost her right eye as a result of the accident;  a year later, she died as a result of the injuries. At Spa, the team's 50th Grand Prix as Virgin/Marussia, Charles Pic was fastest in free practice 2 with Timo Glock sixth. This became the highest ever result in an official Formula One session for the team in its history thanks, however, to the fact that only 10 drivers had set times in the session, due to heavy rain conditions. In Singapore, Timo Glock produced the then best ever race result for Marussia, finishing in 12th place; a result sufficient to elevate Marussia into 10th place in the Constructors' Championship, ahead of closest rivals, Caterham and HRT.

However, at the final race of the season in Brazil, Vitaly Petrov, racing for Caterham, finished the race in 11th place, thus reclaiming 10th place in the Constructors' Championship and the associated prize money for Caterham, demoting Marussia to 11th in the Championship.

2013 season

On 18 December 2012, Marussia announced that Max Chilton would make his Formula One debut in 2013 after securing the second race seat at the team, making him the fourth different driver in the history of the Marussia/Virgin team. Reportedly, Timo Glock left Marussia before the 2013 season for "commercial reasons". Luiz Razia also followed suit shortly after due to sponsorship difficulties, resulting in Ferrari Driver Academy driver, Jules Bianchi, making his Formula One driver début for the  season. On 14 March 2013, Rodolfo González was appointed as the team's reserve driver.

Throughout the year, Marussia and their nearest rivals Caterham remained at the back of the grid, usually qualifying on the back two rows. They fared better in racing, however, and whilst they failed to score any points, they demonstrated good reliability throughout the season. By the end of it, Marussia finished tenth in the Constructors' Championship, ahead of Caterham, earning them significant additional revenue for 2014. English driver Max Chilton became the first rookie driver ever to finish every race in a season.

2014 season

For 2014, Marussia decided to power its MR03 car with Ferrari engines.  Cosworth elected not to build an engine for the new 2014 regulations.  The team retained both Jules Bianchi and Max Chilton as its drivers.

On 24 July, American rookie Alexander Rossi joined the team as a test and reserve driver from Caterham. On 21 August, it was announced he would be replacing Chilton for the  while contractual issues were resolved. However, this decision was reversed the following morning during the free practice session.

The safety car was brought out and the race was subsequently red-flagged. Bianchi was reported as being unconscious after the crash, failing to respond to a radio call from his team and marshals that had gone to his rescue. Due to the precarious weather conditions at the time, he was taken to closest hospital, the Mie University hospital, by ambulance instead of helicopter. On the same day, Bianchi's father reported that his son was in a critical condition with a head injury requiring brain surgery in order to reduce severe bruising to his head. Soon after, the FIA released a statement that CT scans had shown Bianchi suffered a "severe head injury" in the crash, and he would be transferred to intensive care following surgery. A family update later, aside from acknowledging the widespread support, confirmed that Bianchi had suffered a diffuse axonal injury, which is a common traumatic brain injury in vehicle accidents involving high deceleration. Bianchi eventually succumbed to his injuries in July 2015.

At the inaugural  a weekend later, in place of the hospitalized Bianchi, the team originally registered Rossi in the participant list, before finally deciding to field a single car driven by Bianchi's teammate, Max Chilton. In addition, at the same venue, Marussia raced its MR03 car with "#JB17" livery, after Bianchi's initials and race number, to further honour and support their injured driver. Aside from providing updates on their seriously injured driver's medical condition in conjunction with the Bianchi family, a fortnight after the Suzuka accident, the Marussia team also went on public record to condemn various media reports that have been making speculative assertions about the team's direct role in that accident.

On 25 October, it was announced that, along with Caterham, Marussia would be unable to compete at the  due to financial reasons. As transport of Formula One team equipment between the USA and Brazil for return to Europe is coordinated together, Marussia also missed the following weekend's . Around the same time, further media reports revealed that, Formula One teams have agreed to teams in difficulty to miss out up to two races per season and that, on 7 October 2014, Marussia Manor Racing filed a notice in the London High Court intending to assign an administrator. An official statement by the appointed administrator was released on 27 October 2014. In the same week, the team's main financial backer, Andrey Cheglakov, confirmed to Russian news agency ITAR-TASS that he had withdrawn from the team. In addition, British media reported that British-Indian steel industry brothers Baljinder Sohi and Sonny Kaushal were potential buyers for the team.

At the United States Grand Prix, although in breach of Formula One regulations by not being present at that race weekend, the FIA stewards decided to not impose any penalties, in consequence of the team's current financial circumstances, similar to those of the also missing Caterham F1 team. Instead, they referred the matter to the attention of the FIA president.

On 5 November 2014, the FIA included the team in the provisional entry list for the 2015 Formula One season but as the "Manor F1 Team". Two days later, however, the administrator announced that the team had ceased trading and folded, without further entry to F1 making 200 staff members redundant. Notwithstanding this, coinciding with the  weekend, the former team CEO, Graeme Lowdon, remained adamant of the possibility that Marussia could return for the season finale in Abu Dhabi, with a view of also securing its entry in 2015.

Despite this optimism, Marussia failed to appear at the last three races of the season, with its assets sold at auction in mid-December 2014. With the aim of facilitating the entry of his F1 team in 2016, it is reported that Gene Haas purchased Marussia's Banbury base as well as data and designs for the 2015 car, which was already well developed with a scale wind-tunnel model.

After the death of Bianchi, the team's former backer, Andrey Cheglakov, revealed that the events at the 2014 Japanese Grand Prix were a key factor in his decision to quit his financial support of the team.

2015 season

On 19 February 2015, Manor Motorsport's administrators announced that the team had come out of administration and planned to enter the 2015 Formula One season under the name Manor Marussia F1 Team with John Booth and Graeme Lowdon continuing to run the team. This was possible thanks to businessman Stephen Fitzpatrick buying the team, with Justin King joining as chairman.

On 5 February 2015, however, the team's request to compete in the  season using their 2014 chassis was declined by the other Formula One entrants, after Force India voted against the proposal. This report was refuted by the team the following day. Manor ultimately started the season with a modified version of their 2014 car, updated to meet 2015 regulations, and expect to have a new car built specifically for the 2015 regulations ready by the August break. On 25 February 2015, Will Stevens was confirmed as Manor's first driver. On 9 March, it was also announced that Roberto Merhi would be Manor's second driver with Jordan King – son of the new chairman – also joining as the development driver.

Despite this, neither car completed a single lap due to technical difficulties and sat out the entire event.

At the following , both drivers failed to qualify for the race, but received permission from the stewards to start. However, Stevens was unable to leave his garage on race day due to a fuel system problem on his car. Merhi finished his first race in 15th position. A short-lived controversy ensued after the race thanks to claims made by Force India's deputy team principal, Bob Fernley, that Manor Marussia had a clear strategy to run just one car in Malaysia. These claims were dismissed by Manor.

The latter followed a series of other key recruitments in May 2015, including those of Gianluca Pisanello, formerly of Caterham F1 as chief engineer, and former Toro Rosso chief designer, Luca Furbatto, as head of design. In addition to new livery, the MR03B race car also received its first updates at the latter Grand Prix.

Starting in Singapore, Alexander Rossi replaced Merhi for five of the remaining seven Grands Prix of 2015; Merhi raced in Russia and in the season finale in Abu Dhabi.

After the 2015 season, Manor Marussia, officially changed their name to Manor Racing.

Complete Formula One results
(key) (results in bold indicate pole position; races in italics indicate fastest lap)

 Drivers did not finish the race, but were classified as they had completed greater than 90% of the race winner's distance.

References

External links

Marussia Motors
Formula One constructors
Formula One entrants
Russian auto racing teams
British racecar constructors
Companies based in Banbury
Companies that have entered administration in the United Kingdom